The buccinator lymph node or nodes are one or more lymph nodes placed on the Buccinator opposite the angle of the mouth.

References

External links
 

Lymphatics of the head and neck